Tetritskaro or Tetritsqaro is a town in Kvemo Kartli in southern Georgia. It is the municipal center of Tetritsqaro Municipality. According to 2014 Georgian Census its population is 3,093. The Baku-Tbilisi-Kars railway which opened in 2017, runs along the rail line through the town.

History
Original settlement on this location was called Garisi (გარისი), but due to invasions and wars this place got abandoned and in the beginning of the 19th century became a ghost town. Later, this area was resettled by Georgian Azerbaijanis, who called the settlement Agbulakhi; the name was of Azerbaijani origin and literally meant white spring. In 1940, the name was changed to Tetri-Tskaro, which, in Georgian, also means white spring. Town status was granted to it in 1966.

See also
Gudarekhi
Kvemo Kartli

References

Notes

Sources
Е. М. Поспелов (Ye. M. Pospelov). "Имена городов: вчера и сегодня (1917–1992). Топонимический словарь." (City Names: Yesterday and Today (1917–1992). Toponymic Dictionary." Москва, "Русские словари", 1993.

Cities and towns in Kvemo Kartli
Tiflis Governorate
Populated places in Tetritsqaro Municipality
